Sergei Anatolevich Korostin (born July 5, 1989) is a Russian professional ice hockey forward currently playing for Zauralie Kurgan of the Supreme Hockey League (VHL).

Playing career
Korostin was drafted in the third round, 64th overall, by the Dallas Stars in the 2007 NHL Entry Draft from HC Dynamo Moscow of the Russian Super League. Internationally, he delivered at the U18 WJC, scoring in key games against difficult opponents. Both him and Alexei Cherepanov combined for more than half of Russia's goals, potting 5 each. 
On March 12, 2008, Korostin was signed by the Dallas Stars to a three-year entry-level contract. Sergei split the previous season with Dynamo Moscow and the Texas Tornado of the Tier II North American Hockey League.

On June 26, 2008, Korostin was selected by the London Knights from the OHL but was later traded in season to the Peterborough Petes.

On December 2, 2010, Korostin signed with the Russian Major League team Dynamo Tver, he continued to play in the second tiered VHL for the following 10 seasons.

Career statistics

Regular season and playoffs

International

References

External links 

RussianProspects.com Sergei Korostin Profile
 Sergei Korostin's profile on Hockey's Future

1989 births
Dallas Stars draft picks
HC Dynamo Moscow players
Idaho Steelheads (ECHL) players
Living people
London Knights players
MHC Martin players
Metallurg Novokuznetsk players
Peterborough Petes (ice hockey) players
Russian ice hockey right wingers
SKA-Neva players
Texas Stars players
Texas Tornado players
Zauralie Kurgan players
Russian expatriate sportspeople in the United States
Russian expatriate sportspeople in Canada
Russian expatriate sportspeople in Ukraine
Russian expatriate sportspeople in Slovakia
Expatriate ice hockey players in Slovakia
Expatriate ice hockey players in Canada
Expatriate ice hockey players in the United States
Expatriate ice hockey players in Ukraine
Russian expatriate ice hockey people